Johan Frederik Schlegel (22 January 1817, Copenhagen – 8 June 1896, Copenhagen) was a Danish lawyer and civil servant. In 1873, he was elected to the Copenhagen City Council.

He was married to Regine Olsen, who was formerly engaged to the philosopher and theologian Søren Kierkegaard.

References

Governors of the Danish West Indies
1817 births
1896 deaths
19th century in the Danish West Indies
19th-century Copenhagen City Council members
Grand Crosses of the Order of the Dannebrog
Danish civil servants